Catocala aenigma is a moth in the family Erebidae first described by Leo Sheljuzhko in 1943. It is found in south-eastern Siberia.

References

aenigma
Moths described in 1943
Moths of Asia